The Spanish national beach handball team is the national team of Spain. It is governed by the Royal Spanish Handball Federation and takes part in international beach handball competitions.

Results

World Championships

World Games

References

External links
Official website
IHF profile

Beach handball
National beach handball teams